The 5th New Jersey Infantry Regiment was one of four regiments formed by Governor Charles Olden upon requisition of President Abraham Lincoln on July 24, 1861. The regiment departed for Washington, DC on August 24, 1861, and camped at Meridian Hill.

History
The 5th New Jersey Infantry Regiment was ordered to Budd's Ferry in Charles County, Maryland, where they would join Brigadier General Joseph Hooker's Third Brigade and fall under the immediate command of Colonel Samuel H. Starr.  The regiment would soon become part of the New Jersey Second Brigade and be commanded by Colonel William J. Sewell.

The 5th New Jersey Infantry Regiment lost 12 officers and 126 enlisted men killed and mortally wounded and 85 enlisted men to disease during the Civil War. It is honored by a monument at Gettysburg.

References

Units and formations of the Union Army from New Jersey
1861 establishments in New Jersey
Military units and formations established in 1861
Military units and formations disestablished in 1865